Okljuka is a small settlement on the right bank of the Lahinja River, south of Gradac in the Municipality of Metlika in the White Carniola area of southeastern Slovenia. The entire area is part of the traditional region of Lower Carniola and is now included in the Southeast Slovenia Statistical Region.

References

External links
Okljuka on Geopedia

Populated places in the Municipality of Metlika